The Mutual Base Ball Club of New York was a leading American baseball club almost throughout its 20-year history. It was established during 1857, the year of the first baseball convention, just too late to be a founding member of the National Association of Base Ball Players. It was a charter member of both the first professional league in 1871 and the National League in 1876.  

The team was initially formed from firefighters of New York's Mutual Hook and Ladder Company Number One. Boss Tweed operated the team until his arrest in 1871.

The Mutual club initially played its home games at Elysian Fields in Hoboken, with the New York Knickerbockers and many other Manhattan clubs, but moved to the enclosed Union Grounds in Brooklyn in 1868. Though historically identified as "New York", they never staged any home games in Manhattan.

The Mutuals chose open professionalism in 1869–70 after NABBP liberalization. They joined the first professional league, the National Association of Professional Base Ball Players, for its 1871 to 1875 duration. In 1876, the Chicago White Stockings initiated the National League and recruited its members from West to East, partly to wrest control of professional baseball from Eastern interests. The Mutuals were one of eight charter members, six of whom were from the National Association. Weak (sixth place at 21–35) and cash-poor, the club refused to complete its playing obligations in the West; and was expelled.

On May 13, 1876, the Mutuals executed the first triple play in major-league history in a game against the Hartford Dark Blues.

Union Grounds proprietor William Cammeyer, often listed today as the Mutual club owner, signed the Hartford Dark Blues to play at his Union Grounds in 1877. The team was effectively a one-year replacement for the defunct Mutuals, and was sometimes called "Hartford of Brooklyn".

Record

Source for season records: Rio (2008).

Franchise leaders

Batting

Hits – Joe Start (387)
Runs – Joe Start (264)
At bats – Joe Start (1314)
Games – Joe Start (273)
Doubles- Joe Start and Dave Eggler (40)
Home runs – Joe Start (8)
RBIs – Joe Start (187)
Stolen bases – Dave Eggler (36)

Pitching

Wins – Bobby Mathews (100)
ERA – Bobby Mathews (2.41)
Strikeouts – Bobby Mathews (95)
Innings – Bobby Mathews (1,647)

Notable alumni

Lip Pike, major league baseball 4× home run champion
Rynie Wolters, first Dutch professional baseball player

Baseball Hall of Famers

See also
New York Mutuals all-time roster
1871 New York Mutuals season
1872 New York Mutuals season
1873 New York Mutuals season
1874 New York Mutuals season
1875 New York Mutuals season
1876 New York Mutuals season

References 

Baseball-Reference. "New York Mutuals Team Index" (1871–1875). Retrieved 2006-09-17.
Baseball-Reference. "New York Mutuals Team Index" (1876). Retrieved 2006-09-12.
Retrosheet. "New York Mutuals (1871–1876)". Retrieved 2006-09-17.
Wright, Marshall (2000). The National Association of Base Ball Players, 1857–1870. Jefferson, North Carolina: McFarland & Co.

External links
New York Mutuals reenactors
1876 Mutuals at Baseball Reference

 
Defunct Major League Baseball teams
Defunct National Association baseball teams
National Association of Base Ball Players teams
Baseball teams established in 1857
Sports clubs disestablished in 1876
1857 establishments in New York (state)
Defunct baseball teams in New York (state)
Defunct baseball teams in New York City
Baseball teams disestablished in 1876